The 25th NAACP Image Awards ceremony, presented by the National Association for the Advancement of Colored People (NAACP), honored the best in film, television, music of 1992 and took place on January 16, 1993 at the Pasadena Civic Auditorium. It was the 7th year that the event was pre-recorded and televised on NBC.

Awards and nominees

Outstanding Lead Actor in a Motion Picture
 New Jack City: Wesley Snipes

Outstanding Lead Actor in a Comedy Series
 The Cosby Show: Bill Cosby

Outstanding Lead Actress in a Comedy Series
 A Different World: Jasmine Guy

Outstanding Lead Actress in a Motion Picture
 The Long Walk Home: Whoopi Goldberg

Outstanding Comedy Series
 Martin

Outstanding News, Talk or Information
 The Oprah Winfrey Show

Outstanding Motion Picture
 Boyz n the Hood

Outstanding Variety Series
 In Living Color

Outstanding Variety Special
 Great Performances: Natalie Cole - Unforgettable With Love

Outstanding Lead Actor in a Drama Series, Mini-Series or Television Movie
 Gabriel's Fire: James Earl Jones
 The Jacksons: An American Dream: Lawrence Hilton-Jacobs

Outstanding Lead Actress in a Drama Series, Mini-Series or Television Movie
 The Josephine Baker Story: Lynn Whitfield

Outstanding Drama Series, Mini-Series or Television Movie
 In the Heat of the Night

Best Music Video
 Michael Jackson - "Black or White"

Entertainer of the Year Award
 Michael Jackson

References

25
N
N
N